Utricularia leptoplectra is a terrestrial or subaquatic carnivorous plant that belongs to the genus Utricularia (family Lentibulariaceae). It is endemic to Australia with a distribution in the Northern Territory from the area around Darwin, east to the Arnhem Land plateau, south to Katherine, and west to the western Kimberley region in Western Australia.

See also 
 List of Utricularia species

References 

Carnivorous plants of Australia
Flora of the Northern Territory
Eudicots of Western Australia
leptoplectra
Lamiales of Australia
Taxa named by Ferdinand von Mueller